Elachista staintonella is a moth of the family Elachistidae. It is found in the United States, where it has been recorded from Texas.

The forewings are pale ocherous, with brownish dusting and an irregular angulated creamy white fascia before the middle, as well as a faintly defined narrower acutely angulated fascia at two-thirds. The basal third of the wing is ocherous. The hindwings are yellowish white, with fuscous dusting.

References

staintonella
Moths described in 1878
Moths of North America